Apostolepis cearensis, the Caatinga blackhead or Gomes's burrowing snake, is a species of snake in the family Colubridae. It is endemic to Brazil.

References 

cearensis
Reptiles described in 1915
Reptiles of Brazil